

Buildings and structures

Buildings
  1860 BC, construction of the Ancient Egyptian fortress at Buhen
 Nuraghe Santu Antine

See also
19th century BC
18th century BC in architecture
Timeline of architecture

References 

Architecture